Sherbournieae is a tribe of flowering plants in the family Rubiaceae and contains 54 species in 4 genera. Its representatives are found in tropical and southern Africa.

Genera 
Currently accepted names
 Atractogyne Pierre (2 sp) 
 Mitriostigma Hochst. (5 sp)
 Oxyanthus DC. (34 sp)
 Sherbournia G.Don (13 sp)

Synonyms
 Afrohamelia Wernham = Atractogyne
 Amaralia Welw. ex Hook.f. = Sherbournia
 Megacarpha Hochst. = Oxyanthus

References 

Ixoroideae tribes